Rosie Carney (born 13 January 1997) is an Irish musician.

History
Carney was born in Hampshire, England but moved to Ireland at the age of ten. Carney signed a record deal at age 16.  In 2017, Carney released a song titled Winter. In 2019, Carney released her debut full-length album titled Bare. In December 2020, she released a full cover LP of Radiohead’s The Bends.

References

Living people
Irish women musicians
1997 births